Edwin Foster Coddington (June 24, 1870 – December 21, 1950) was an American astronomer and discoverer of astronomical objects.

He co-discovered the comet C/1898 L1 (Coddington-Pauly), also known by the older designation Comet 1898 VII. He also discovered 3 asteroids, and the galaxy IC 2574 in Ursa Major, which later became known as "Coddington's Nebula".

References

External links 
 
 Portrait of Edwin Foster Coddington from the Lick Observatory Records Digital Archive, UC Santa Cruz Library's Digital Collections

1870 births
1950 deaths
19th-century American astronomers
20th-century American astronomers
Discoverers of asteroids
Discoverers of comets